Major General Prince Kaew Nawarat (()  ; Birth name: Kaew na Chiangmai) (29 September 1862 – 3 June 1939) was the 36th and last King of Lanna and Prince Ruler of Chiang Mai, reigning from 1910 to 1939 (Thai calendar 2454-2482). He succeeded  Intavaroros Suriyavongse (1897–1910). His seat was within Lanna's capital Chiang Mai, but he never held any true administrative power. With him ended the reign of the Seven Princes Dynasty.

Early life
Nawarat was born September 29, 1862, at the royal residence of Chiang Mai (คุ้มหลวงนครเชียงใหม่) as the 6th son of Phra Choa Intavichyanon, 7th ruling prince of Chiang Mai and Mae Choa Kew.

In 1877, when he was 15 years old and his father still ruled Chiang Mai, Nawarat was appointed as Vice minister of treasury. That same year, he brought 300 Chiang Mai and Lamphun families to Chiang San. In 1882, he became the Minister of treasury, responsible for bringing the royal tribute to King Rama V in Bangkok in 1886. He became the Minister of interior in 1899.

Marriage and family
When he was 22 years old, he married Mae Choa Jammary, daughter of Choa Rajapakinai Panfar. After that he married Choaying Fai, Mom Buakew, and Mom Sae. He had 4 sons and 2 daughters with his wives; with Mae Choa Jammary:
 Sukkasem na Chiengmai
 Buathip na Chiengmai
 Wongtawan na Chiengmai

And with Mom Kew:
 Prince Pong in
 Princess Siriprakay
 Prince Inthanon

Reign
In 1909, Nawarat became acting ruling Prince of Chiang Mai. Following his brother's death in 1911, he officially took the throne. His duties included commanding Northern soldiers to quash rebels, building roads in Chiang Mai and another province, and being special guard of the King as Major General of Royal Thai Army.

In 1914, Chao Dara Rasmi, the Princess consort of Chulalongkorn, who had a great part within the merger of Lanna with the Kingdom of Thailand, returned to Chiang Mai. The king gave her a residence at the Chedi Ngarm Palane Sala. In 1923 he built the current South Building as a wedding gift to his daughter Chao Siriprakai Na Chiengmai. Within this building, King Rama VII and Queen Rambhai Barni stayed during 1926 on a royal visi to Chiang Mai.

In 1933 Princess Phra Raja Jaya Chao Dara Rasmi died and the king oversaw her coffin being put to lay in state at the Chedi Ngarm Palace (remained in state from December 9, 1933 to April 23, 1934).

In 1934 he built the building of the current U.S. Consulate General at Chiang Mai, which replaced the old teak house.

In 1938, the king's daughter, the princess Chao Siriprakai Na Chiengmai died.

Nawarat became sick in early 1938, but he went to Bangkok when King Ananda Mahidol came back to Bangkok. He became sick again in March 1938. Upon his death in 1939, the royalty was abolished and the throne of the Lanna Kings, who had reigned over a Kingdom that was founded in the same period as Sukhothai and which existed for several centuries more, was replaced with a governors seat, a seat which was appointed from Bangkok.

His coffin lay in state at the Chedi Ngarm Royal Villa from June 3 to July 23, 1939.

Issue

External links

photo of the Prince Ruler: 
another photo of the Prince Ruler: 
the Prince Ruler's coffin: 

|-

1862 births
1939 deaths
Rulers of Chiang Mai
Kaew Nawarat
Chet Ton dynasty
20th-century Thai monarchs